Beauty and the Beast is a platform game developed by Probe Software and published by Hudson Soft for the Nintendo Entertainment System. It was released in Europe in 1994.

References

Beauty and the Beast (franchise) video games
Nintendo Entertainment System games
Nintendo Entertainment System-only games
1994 video games
Hudson Soft games
Video games based on films
Video games based on adaptations
Video games scored by Jeroen Tel
Video games developed in the United Kingdom
Video games set in France
Europe-exclusive video games
Single-player video games